Ageneiosus polystictus is a species of driftwood catfish of the family Auchenipteridae. It can be found on the Amazon basin.

References

Bibliography
Eschmeyer, William N., ed. 1998. Catalog of Fishes. Special Publication of the Center for Biodiversity Research and Information, num. 1, vol. 1–3. California Academy of Sciences. San Francisco, California, United States. 2905. .

Ageneiosus
Fish described in 1915
Freshwater fish of Brazil